Harvey A. Derne (May 1, 1874 – January 1, 1921) was an American college football coach and a figure in the lumber industry in the early 1900s. He served as the head football coach at Ohio University in 1895, compiling a record of 2–3. Derne served was a noted athlete at St. John's College in Annapolis, Maryland. At the time of his death, he was an employee at the W. M. Ritter Lumber Company.

Head coaching record

References

External links
 

1874 births
1921 deaths
Ohio Bobcats football coaches
St. John's College (Annapolis/Santa Fe) alumni
Sportspeople from Maryland